The New York State armory building in Kingston, New York, now the Andy Murphy Midtown Neighborhood Center, is a historic 19th-century building designed by architect J. A. Wood.

References

Armories in New York (state)
Kingston, New York
Ulster County, New York